(16 September 1895 – 24 April 1984) was a Japanese actor. He appeared in more than 160 films from 1940 to 1975.

Career
Starting out in shingeki theater, Yanagi moved to shinpa and formed the Shinsei Shinpa theater troupe with Shōtaro Hanayagi in 1939. He also appeared as a supporting actor in many films.

Selected filmography

References

External links 

1895 births
1984 deaths
Japanese male film actors
Actors from Hyōgo Prefecture
Recipients of the Medal with Purple Ribbon
Recipients of the Order of the Rising Sun, 4th class